Pandiaka is a genus of flowering plants belonging to the family Amaranthaceae.

Its native range is Tropical Africa to Namibia.

Species
Species:

Pandiaka angustifolia 
Pandiaka carsonii 
Pandiaka confusa 
Pandiaka elegantissima 
Pandiaka involucrata 
Pandiaka metallorum 
Pandiaka porphyrargyrea 
Pandiaka ramulosa 
Pandiaka richardsiae 
Pandiaka rubrolutea 
Pandiaka trichinioides 
Pandiaka welwitschii

References

Amaranthaceae
Amaranthaceae genera